Eucalyptus insularis, commonly known as Twin Peak Island mallee, or North Twin Peak Island mallee, is a species of mallee that is endemic to a small area of southern Western Australia. It has mostly smooth bark, dull green, linear adult leaves, flower buds in group of between nine and twenty or more, white flowers and barrel-shaped fruit.

Description
It has smooth greyish bark, sometimes with rough, fibrous bark on larger stems. Flowering occurs in August and the flowers are white or creamy white.

Taxonomy and naming
Eucalyptus insularis was first formally described in 1974 by Ian Brooker from a specimen collected on North Twin Peak Island in the Recherche Archipelago and the description was published in the journal Nuytsia. The specific epithet (insularis) is a Latin word meaning 'of an island', referring to the location of the type specimen.

In 2014, Dean Nicolle and Ian Brooker described two subspecies of E. insularis and the names have been accepted by the Australian Plant Census:

Distribution and habitat
The Twin Peak Island mallee grows in closed shrubland and heath near granite outcrops. Subspecies continentalis is only known from two or three populations on the mainland in the Cape Le Grand National Park and subspecies insularis only grows on North Twin Peak Island.

Conservation status
Twin Peak Island mallee is listed as "endangered" under the Australian Government Environment Protection and Biodiversity Conservation Act 1999.

Subspecies continentalis is listed as "Threatened Flora (Declared Rare Flora — Extant)" by the Department of Environment and Conservation (Western Australia). Subspecies insularis is listed as is classified as "Priority Four", meaning that is rare or near threatened.
The main threat to the species is increasing fragmentation and loss of remnant populations.

See also
List of Eucalyptus species

References

Eucalypts of Western Australia
insularis
Myrtales of Australia
Plants described in 1974
Taxa named by Ian Brooker